Televizija 24 (formerly 24 Vesti) is a 24-hour news channel originating from the national capital of Skopje, North Macedonia, reporting on national, regional and international news.

Line up
The following shows air on 24 Vesti.

 24 Analysis 
 24 From Heart 
 24 News 
 24 Reportage 
 About Life 
 Culture Matrix 
 Evrozum 
 Eyes on Eyes 
 Factor Health 
 Road to success  
 Second Opinion  
 Third Gate 
 Third Half 
 Trend 
 Work Saturday

References

External links

Television channels in North Macedonia
Mass media in Skopje
24-hour television news channels